Gender and Language is an international, peer-reviewed academic journal for language-based research on gender and sexuality from feminist, queer, and trans perspectives. Gender and Language is currently one of the few academic journals to which scholars interested in the intersection of these dimensions can turn, whether as contributors looking for an audience sharing this focus or as readers seeking a reliable source for current discussions in the field. The journal showcases research on the social analytics of gender in discourse domains that include institutions, media, politics and everyday interaction. According to the Journal Citation Reports, the journal has a 2020 Journal Impact Factor (JIF) of .976, and a Journal Citation Indicator (JCI) of 0.76. The journal has a 2020 CiteScore of 1.2, an SRJ of 0.413. and a SNIP of 1.166

The journal is a published four times annually by Equinox Publishing on behalf of the International Gender and Language Association. Equinox and IGALA continue to enjoy a close partnership to further mutual goals of promoting cutting edge research on gender and language. Most critically, the journal aims to bring together a pan-global, interdisciplinary consortium of scholars whose work collectively challenges established disciplinary boundaries and incorporates multiple geopolitical axes of academic interpretation. The journal's editors-in-chief are Rodrigo Borba (Universidade Federal do Rio de Janeiro), Kira Hall (University of Colorado Boulder), and Mie Hiramoto (National University of Singapore).

As a point of departure, Gender and Language defines gender along two key dimensions. First, gender is a key element of social relationships that are often loosely linked to perceived differences between women and men. Gender relations are ideologically encoded in linguistic and symbolic representations, normative concepts, institutions, social practices, and social identities. Second, gender is a primary arena for articulating power in complex interaction with other dimensions of social difference and identity, such as class, race, ability, age, and sexuality. Gender is understood as multi-faceted, always changing, and often contested. 

The journal welcomes research employing a range of different approaches, among them applied linguistics, conversation analysis, corpus linguistics, critical discourse analysis, discursive psychology, embodied sociolinguistics, ethnography of communication, interactional sociolinguistics, linguistic anthropology, linguistic landscapes, pragmatics, raciolinguistics, social semiotics, sociophonetics, stylistics, symbolic interactionism and variationist sociolinguistics.

Abstracting and indexing 
The journal is abstracted and indexed in:

According to Scopus, the journal has a 2020 CiteScore of 1.2, an SJR of .413, and a SNIP of 1.166. According to the Journal Citation Reports, the journal has a 2019 impact factor of 0.619 and a five year impact factor of 0.713.

See also 
 List of women's studies journals
 List of Linguistics journals

References

External links 
 

English-language journals
Equinox Publishing (Sheffield) academic journals
Grammatical gender
Linguistics journals
Publications established in 2007
Triannual journals
Women's studies journals